Johann Pennarius, O.F.M. (died 1563) was a Roman Catholic prelate who served as Auxiliary Bishop of Cologne (1557–1563).

Biography
On 6 Oct 1557, Johann Pennarius was appointed during the papacy of Pope Paul IV as Auxiliary Bishop of Cologne and Titular Bishop of Cyrene. He served as Auxiliary Bishop of Cologne until his death on 11 Sep 1563.

References

External links and additional sources
 (for Chronology of Bishops) 
 (for Chronology of Bishops)  
 (for Chronology of Bishops) 
 (for Chronology of Bishops)  

16th-century German Roman Catholic bishops
Bishops appointed by Pope Paul IV
1563 deaths